Second Legislative Assembly of Sindh was dissolved by Governor Sir Francis Mudie due no confidence motion against the Premier of the second assembly, elections for the third legislative assembly of Sindh took place on 9th December 1946. All India Muslim league won 33 out of 35 Muslim seats of the assembly.

List of members of the 3rd Provincial Assembly of Sindh 

Tenure of the third provincial assembly of Sindh  started on 17th Feb 1947 till 29th December 1951.

The following members gave oath of allegiance to the new established state of Pakistan on 4th Feb, 1948.

See Also 

List of members of the 1st Provincial Assembly of Sindh

List of members of the 2nd Provincial Assembly of Sindh

List of members of the 4th Provincial Assembly of Sindh

References 
 

Provincial Assembly of Sindh